Twentysix may refer to:

26 (number), a natural number
Twentysix, Kentucky, United States
Twentysix Gasoline Stations, an artist's book by American pop artist Ed Ruscha